PVC Bendit is a tool that uses heat to soften PVC pipe from the inside.  It consists of an electrical resistance heating element jacketed in a metal hose with a power supply cable.  It is primarily used to bend PVC pipe, though it can also be used to bend other thermoplastic tubes and sheets. It works by bringing up the temperature of the pipe or sheet to the softening point of 176 degrees or higher. Naturally, the longer the pipe is on the bender, the hotter and softer it will get.  Once the pipe is softened, it can be formed into different shapes within the limitations of the material.  When cooled, the pipe will retain all of the properties of the original material, but it will have additional stress on the points of the pipe that are stretched or compressed in the bending process.

History
PVC Bendit was designed in late 2010 to early 2011 as a way to bend longer sections of pipe than were possible with other methods.  The inventor, Victor Johnson of Manitou Springs, Colorado, was looking for a method to bend long sticks of clear PVC to make a lighting system, and he could not find a method to efficiently bend more than two feet of pipe at a time. After extensive research on the properties of the material, he devised and patented this system.

Applications
Bent PVC by any method can be used for a wide variety of tasks:  fitting-mitigation in plumbing and electrical applications,  greenhouses, furniture, assistance with activities of daily living, toys, games, art, refrigeration systems, etc.

References

External links
Slab Leak Solution

Plumbing